Margarita Tapia García (born 16 November 1976) is a Mexican long-distance runner. She competed in the women's marathon at the 2004 Summer Olympics.

References

External links
 

1976 births
Living people
Athletes (track and field) at the 2004 Summer Olympics
Mexican female long-distance runners
Mexican female marathon runners
Olympic athletes of Mexico
Athletes from Mexico City
20th-century Mexican women